Harrison Edwards (born 19 October 2000) is an Australian professional rugby league footballer who plays as a er and  for the Canterbury-Bankstown Bulldogs in the NRL.

Background
Edwards was born in Penrith, New South Wales and raised in the Mid North Coast town of Pacific Palms. He played his junior rugby league for the Forster Tuncurry Hawks.

Playing career
In 2018 and 2019, Edwards played for the Sydney Roosters in the Jersey Flegg Cup.

Edwards made his first grade debut from the bench in his side's 24–10 victory over the Newcastle Knights in round 20 of the 2022 season.

References

External links
Canterbury Bulldogs profile
NSWRL profile

2000 births
Australian rugby league players
Rugby league second-rows
Canterbury-Bankstown Bulldogs players
Living people
Rugby league